Yat Shing "Sunny" Wong （:王日昇）(born 29 July 1978) is a Hong Kong racing driver currently competing in the TCR Asia Series. Having previously competed in the China Touring Car Championship, Asian Touring Car Series, Hong Kong Touring Car Championship and Asian Formula Renault Series amongst others.

Racing career
Wong began his career in 2009 in China Formula Campus. In 2010 he switched to the Asian Formula Renault Series, finishing 6th in the standings in 2013. He raced in the Hong Kong Touring Car Championship from 2010–12, winning the championship in 2012. In 2013 he raced in the Asian Touring Car Series, he finished the season 2nd in the championship standings. In 2014 he switched to the China Touring Car Championship finishing 4th in the championship standings in 2015.

In November 2015 it was announced that he would race in the TCR Asia Series & TCR International Series, driving a Honda Civic TCR for WestCoast Racing.

On 25 July 2019, Teamwork Huff Motorsport ended its TCR UK programme, the team had entered Sunny Wong into the 2019 TCR UK series, committing to its entry before the news that the series was to be combined with the Touring Car Trophy.

On 18 November 2019, Sunny Wong took his Subaru Impreza WRX to a pole-to-flag win in the Macau Touring Car Cup. The race was called to an end only after seven laps, of which five were completed behind the safety car.

Racing record

Complete TCR International Series results
(key) (Races in bold indicate pole position) (Races in italics indicate fastest lap)

† Driver did not finish the race, but was classified as he completed over 90% of the race distance.

TCR Spa 500 results

References

External links
 

1978 births
Living people
TCR Asia Series drivers
TCR International Series drivers
Hong Kong racing drivers
Asian Formula Renault Challenge drivers
24H Series drivers